Robert and Bertram (German: Robert und Bertram, die lustigen Vagabunden) is a 1915 German silent comedy film directed by Max Mack and starring Eugen Burg, Ferdinand Bonn and Ernst Lubitsch. It is based on the 1856 Gustav Räder play Robert and Bertram about the adventures of two wandering vagrants, which has been turned into films on several occasions.

It was shot at the Tempelhof Studios in Berlin.

Cast
Eugen Burg as Robert 
Ferdinand Bonn as Bertram 
Wilhelm Diegelmann as Gefängniswärter 
Ernst Lubitsch as Kommis Max Edelstein

Bibliography
Bergfelder, Tim & Bock, Hans-Michael. The Concise Cinegraph: Encyclopedia of German. Berghahn Books, 2009.
O'Brien, Mary-Elizabeth. Nazi Cinema as Enchantment: The Politics of Entertainment in the Third Reich''. Camden House, 2004.

External links

1915 films
Films of the German Empire
German silent feature films
German comedy films
Films directed by Max Mack
German films based on plays
German black-and-white films
Films shot at Tempelhof Studios
1915 comedy films
Silent comedy films
1910s German films
1910s German-language films